Maly Umys is a village in Kochkurovsky District of the Republic of Mordovia, Russia.

References

Rural localities in Mordovia
Kochkurovsky District